American singer Madonna has released 92 singles and 24 promotional singles and charted with 12 other songs. She has sold more than 100 million singles worldwide. According to Billboard, Madonna is the most successful solo artist in Hot 100 chart history, second overall behind the Beatles. In the United Kingdom, Madonna has scored a total of 63 top-ten hits (more than any other female artist) and 12 number-two peaks (more than any other act). In 2012, she was ranked as the best-selling singles female artist in the UK (fourth general) with 17.6 million singles sold. At the 40th anniversary of the GfK Media Control Charts, Madonna was ranked as the most successful singles artist in German chart history. Her long-standing success with the single format was remarked upon in The New Rolling Stone Album Guide (2004), where editors wrote that she is a "deserving candidate for the title of greatest singles artist since the 1960s heyday of the single";  the staff of Slant commented in 2020 that "by every objective measure, she's the most successful singles artist of all time".

In 1982, Madonna signed a record deal with Sire Records, and released her first two singles preceding her self-titled debut album. Her first entry on the US Billboard Hot 100 was "Holiday" (1983), which also became her first top-ten hit song in several countries. The following year, she achieved her first number-one single in Australia, Canada, and the US with "Like a Virgin" from the album of the same name. In 1985, she released her second US number-one single, "Crazy for You", and her first UK number-one single, "Into the Groove": both from feature film soundtracks. Soon after, all five singles from her third studio album True Blue (1986)—"Live to Tell", "Papa Don't Preach", "True Blue", "Open Your Heart",  and "La Isla Bonita"—reached number one in the US or the UK. The title track from Madonna's fourth studio album, Like a Prayer (1989), made her the female artist with the most US number-one singles in the 1980s (tied with Whitney Houston). The album's next singles, "Express Yourself" and "Cherish", both peaked at number two on the Hot 100, giving Madonna the record for the most consecutive top-five singles by any artist with 16.

In 1990, the single "Vogue" was released from the album I'm Breathless. The song topped most charts in all major music markets. With "This Used to Be My Playground", Madonna became the female artist with the most US number-one singles at that time. Her fifth studio album, Erotica (1992), was her first album released on Maverick Records, a Warner Brothers Records-owned label that was headed by Madonna. It was her least successful album up to that point, but overall it still saw some success with singles such as  "Erotica", "Deeper and Deeper", and "Rain" becoming hits in the US. Her 1994 studio album Bedtime Stories spawned the lead single "Secret", which became her record-setting 35th consecutive UK top-ten single. The album's second single, "Take a Bow", remains her longest-running US number-one single with seven weeks atop the chart. "Frozen", from the 1998 studio album Ray of Light, became her first ever single to debut at number one in the UK. All the follow-up singles from the album were also top-ten hits in several countries.

In 2000, Madonna scored her 12th US number-one single, "Music", from the album of the same name. "Hung Up", from the 2005 album Confessions on a Dance Floor, became her best-charting song worldwide and earned a place in the 2007 Guinness Book of World Records for topping the charts in the most countries (41 countries). "4 Minutes", from her 2008 studio album Hard Candy, gave Madonna her 37th Billboard Hot 100 top-ten, surpassing Elvis Presley as the artist with the most top-ten singles. The song also extended Madonna's record as the female artist with the most UK number-one singles with 13. In 2009, Billboard ranked Madonna as the Top Singles Sales Artist of the Decade. "Give Me All Your Luvin'", from Madonna's 2012 studio album, MDNA, became her 25th number-one single in Canada and her record-extending 38th US top-ten single. In 2020, "I Don't Search I Find", the fourth single from the 2019 album Madame X, became her record-extending 50th number-one song on the US Dance Club Songs, thus making her the only artist to top the chart in five consecutive decades. She remains the artist with the most number ones on a singular Billboard chart, extending her record over George Strait who earned 44 number ones on the Hot Country Singles chart.

Singles

1980s

1990s

2000s

2010s

2020s

Promotional singles

Other charted songs

See also

 Artists with the most number-ones on the U.S. Dance Club Songs chart
 List of artists by number of Canadian number-one singles (RPM)
 List of artists by number of UK Singles Chart number ones
 List of artists who reached number one in the United States
 List of artists who reached number one on the Australian singles chart
 List of artists who reached number one on the French Singles Chart
 List of artists who reached number one on the Italian Singles Chart
 List of artists who reached number one on the Spanish Singles Chart
 List of best-selling singles in Finland
 List of best-selling singles in Japan by Western acts
 List of best-selling music artists in the United Kingdom in singles sales
 List of Romanian Top 100 number ones

Notes

References

Footnotes

Sources

External links

Discographies of American artists
Pop music discographies
Singles